Mousley is an English surname. Notable people with the surname include:

Bradley Mousley  (born 1996), Australian tennis player
George Mousley Cannon (1861 – 1937), first president of the Utah State Senate
Kay Mousley (born ?), Electoral Commissioner for the Electoral Commission of South Australia

English-language surnames